Pat Flaherty (born April 27, 1956) is a former American football coach. He most recently served as offensive line coach for the Miami Dolphins of the National Football League (NFL) in 2019, but was fired before the season began.

Playing career
Flaherty attended East Stroudsburg University and was a student and a letterman in football. In football, he was the starting center and won All-America honors.

Coaching

Collegiate
Flaherty began his coaching career at his alma mater, Delone Catholic High School in McSherrystown, Pennsylvania from 1978–79. Flaherty moved to the collegiate ranks, coaching the offensive line at his alma mater, East Stroudsburg University, from 1980–81.

He then joined the Penn State coaching staff from 1982–1983 as an assistant under offensive line coach Dick Anderson. At Penn State, he helped the Nittany Lions win the 1982 National Championship with a Sugar Bowl victory over Georgia. When Anderson left to become head coach at Rutgers prior to the 1984 season, Flaherty joined him on the Scarlet Knights' staff, where he remained through the 1991 season.

Flaherty spent the 1992 season coaching the defensive line at East Carolina. From 1993–98, he was on the staff at Wake Forest, where he coached the offensive line, tight ends and special teams. In 1999, he coached tight ends and special teams and was in charge of recruiting at the University of Iowa.

NFL
Flaherty became the tight ends coach of the Washington Redskins under the head coach at the time, Norv Turner, in 2000. However, after just 1 season, Flaherty was relieved of his duties due to Norv Turner being fired midway through the season. In 2004, Flaherty became the offensive line coach of the New York Giants. He was hired to a new staff under new head coach Tom Coughlin, and received two Super Bowl rings during this time. He would remain in this position until 2015 when Tom Coughlin stepped down, thus beginning a coaching staff overhaul. On January 22, 2016, Flaherty was hired by new head coach Chip Kelly to become the offensive line coach of the San Francisco 49ers. On January 14, 2017, Flaherty was hired by new head coach Doug Marrone to become the offensive line coach of the Jacksonville Jaguars. On December 31, 2018, following a disappointing 5-11 campaign, Flaherty was one of three assistant coaches that were fired at the end of the season.

On February 8, 2019, the Miami Dolphins announced they had hired Flaherty as their offensive line coach. On July 29, 2019, the Dolphins head coach, Brian Flores, fired Flaherty just four days into training camp and replaced him with team analyst Dave DeGuglielmo.

References

1956 births
Living people
American football centers
Chicago Bears coaches
East Carolina Pirates football coaches
East Stroudsburg Warriors football coaches
East Stroudsburg Warriors football players
Iowa Hawkeyes football coaches
Miami Dolphins coaches
New York Giants coaches
Penn State Nittany Lions football coaches
Rutgers Scarlet Knights football coaches
Wake Forest Demon Deacons football coaches
Washington Redskins coaches
High school football coaches in Pennsylvania
People from Adams County, Pennsylvania
Sportspeople from Clarksburg, West Virginia
Players of American football from Pennsylvania
Educators from Pennsylvania